The 2017 South American Rhythmic Gymnastics Championships were held in Cochabamba, Bolivia, September 27–29, 2017. The competition was organized by the Bolivian Gymnastics Federation and approved by the International Gymnastics Federation.

Participating nations

Medal summary

Medal table

References 

2017 in gymnastics
Rhythmic Gymnastics,2017
International gymnastics competitions hosted by Bolivia
2017 in Bolivian sport